Tamburello, named Tambass in Piedmont, is a court game invented in the northern provinces of Italy during the 16th century.
 It is a modification of the ancient game of pallone col bracciale, bearing the same general relation to it as Squash does to Racquets. Tamburello is also similar in form to tennis.

Tamburello and its variations remain popular today in many nations of the world.

Forms

Open
This form is played at professional level in Italy where there are two varieties: the first kind taking place in a specialised sports venue called a sphaeristerium (sferisterio in Italian), with a lateral wall which permits the ball to rebound; the second kind being played in an open playing field without a lateral wall. Five players regularly form a side, each carrying in one hand an implement called a tamburello, resembling a tambourine (whence the name), which is a round frame of wood over which a cover of horsehide is tightly stretched. A rubber ball generally larger than a tennis ball is used. One of the players opens the service (battuta), which begins from a small square called the trampolino, situated at one corner of the battuta but outside the court. The service must be over the middle line. The ball must then be hit from side to side over the line, the side failing to return it or sending it out of court losing a point. The game is scored like lawn tennis, four points constituting a game, counting 15+15+10+10.

Indoor
Tamburello Indoor is practiced in an enclosed space such as a sports hall or a school gym on a small field and each team has maximum 8 players of which 3 simultaneously in the field. The ball in this case cannot be made of rubber, because too fast, and then using the tennis ball type depressurized. This is the tamburello's form more prevalent among the world: they play at least in 20 nations.

Tambeach
Tambeach is played on sand so players must hit the ball in flight before it contacts the ground. Players stand on a field which is 24x12 metres split in half by a net high 2.15 m. They play in this manner: one player versus other one or two players versus other two like beach tennis.

Tambutennis
In tambutennis two players regularly stand in each side on a court split in half by a net like tennis. The ball, used in this game, is made with terrycloth.

Tambourelli
Tambourelli is form which was started by Scottish players and it is similar to tambeach and badminton because they  play with a shuttlecock.

Notes

References

External links 

 Italian tamburello supplier 
 Catalan Tamburello Federation

Video
Open or 5 players a side
Indoor or 3 players a side

Team sports
Ball games
Sports originating in Italy